For Christmas with Love is a 1968 Christmas album by Australian recording artist Judith Durham. It was her first solo studio album after leaving the Seekers in July 1968. The album was recorded in Hollywood and Judith subsequently headlined her own concert tours across New Zealand and Australia.

The album was re-released on CD in 2002.

Track listing
LP/ Cassette
 "White Christmas" – 2:42
 "Mary's Boy Child" – 2:54
 "Go Tell It on a Mountain" – 1:54
 "Lullaby for Christmas Eve" – 2:26
  "The Lord's Prayer" – 2:11
 "My Faith" – 2:35
 "Come On Children Let's Sing" – 2:08
 "The Christmas Song (Chestnuts Roasting on an Open Fire)" – 2:27
 "Silent Night" – 2:04
 "Joy to the World" – 1:53

External links
 For Christmas with Love at Discogs

References

1968 debut albums
1968 Christmas albums
Christmas albums by Australian artists
Judith Durham albums
Columbia Records albums
EMI Records albums
Pop Christmas albums